Lucas Adrián Hoyos (born 29 April 1989) is an Argentine professional footballer who plays as a goalkeeper for Vélez Sarsfield.

Career

Club
Hoyos' career began with Newell's Old Boys, firstly in the youth ranks before making the move into senior football. He made his Newell's Old Boys debut on 20 November 2014 in an Argentine Primera División defeat to Defensa y Justicia. Before that, Hoyos spent time out on loan at two clubs. First, he joined San Martín of Torneo Argentino A before completing a move to Primera B Nacional side Gimnasia y Esgrima. He made seventy-one appearances across two seasons for Gimnasia prior to returning to Newell's to make his debut for them. 2015 saw Hoyos join another Primera B Nacional team, Instituto, permanently.

Sixty-three league matches later he departed to join Argentine Primera División club Atlético de Rafaela in 2016. Rafaela were relegated at the end of 2016–17 season, Hoyos subsequently left to rejoin Instituto. His second debut for the club came on 21 August 2017 in the Copa Argentina against River Plate. He made his 200th league appearance in the following November versus previous club Atlético de Rafaela. July 2018 saw Hoyos complete a move to Vélez Sarsfield of the Primera División.
 Finalizando el 2022, Lucas Hoyos se encuentra con el plantel de Newell's Old Boys, ya que ya está acordada su llegada y faltan detalles para firmar. Mientras realiza chequeos medicos-deportivos.

International
Hoyos won six caps for Sergio Batista's Argentina U20s team during 2008 and 2009.

Career statistics
.

References

External links
 

1989 births
Living people
Sportspeople from Mendoza Province
Argentine footballers
Argentina under-20 international footballers
Association football goalkeepers
Primera Nacional players
Argentine Primera División players
Torneo Argentino A players
Newell's Old Boys footballers
San Martín de Tucumán footballers
Gimnasia y Esgrima de Jujuy footballers
Instituto footballers
Atlético de Rafaela footballers
Club Atlético Vélez Sarsfield footballers